The Planetary Defense Coordination Office (PDCO) is a planetary defense organization established in January 2016 within NASA's Planetary Science Division of the Science Mission Directorate.

Its mission is to look for and catalogue near-Earth objects such as comets and asteroids and potentially hazardous objects that could impact Earth and to help the U.S. government prepare for a potential impact event (and coordinate efforts to mitigate and deflect potential threats if one is detected).

History 

In 2005, the U.S. Congress passed the NASA Authorization Act, which, in part, tasked NASA with finding and cataloguing at least 90% of all near-Earth objects that are 140 meters or larger by 2020. However, that goal was clearly not being met by NASA's Near Earth Object Observations Program, which a 2014 report by the NASA Office of Inspector General pointed out. In June 2015, NASA and National Nuclear Security Administration of the U.S. Department of Energy, which had been studying impact events on their own, signed an agreement to work in cooperation.

In January 2016, NASA officially announced the establishment of the Planetary Defense Coordination Office (PDCO), appointing Lindley Johnson to lead it as Planetary Defense Officer. The PDCO was given the job of cataloging and tracking potentially hazardous near-Earth objects (NEO), such as asteroids and comets, larger than 30–50 meters in diameter (compare to the 20-meter Chelyabinsk meteor that hit Russia in 2013) and coordinating an effective threat response and mitigation effort.

It has been a part of several key NASA missions, including OSIRIS-REx, NEOWISE, and Double Asteroid Redirection Test (DART). For NEOWISE, NASA worked with the Jet Propulsion Laboratory, to investigate various impact-threat scenarios in order to learn the best approach to the threat of an incoming impactor. The office will continue to use the polar orbiting infrared telescope NEOWISE to detect any potentially hazardous objects.

Double Asteroid Redirection Test (DART), a joint project between NASA and the Johns Hopkins Applied Physics Laboratory, is the first planetary defense mission of NASA. In November 2021, the DART spacecraft was launched with the goal of seeing if it could "alter an asteroid's path, a technique that may be used to defend the planet in the future".

In popular culture 

The 2021 movie Don't Look Up is about a "planet killer" comet, in which the Planetary Defense Officer is played by Rob Morgan.  The PDCO chief Lindley Johnson vetted an early draft of the screenplay over two years before the film's 2021 release.

See also 

 Asteroid impact avoidance
 Don't Look Up (2021 film)
 Double Asteroid Redirection Test
 Impact event

References

External links 
 NASA’s New Planetary Defense Office planetary.org
 https://www.nasa.gov/specials/pdco/index.html

Planetary defense organizations
NASA